Mathilde Caffey is a Danish-American singer. She became the runner-up of the thirteenth season of the Danish version of the X Factor behind the winner Alma Agger.

Performances during X Factor

Discography

Singles
 "Karma is a Bitch" (2020)

EPs

References

External links

21st-century Danish women singers
Living people
2004 births